Dirk van Teylingen, lord of Brederode ( 1180 – 1236) was lord of Brederode and landdrost of the counts of Holland.

Life
He was the son of William van Teylingen. Two mothers are linked to him; Mary of Castricum and Agnes of Bentheim. Dirk is seen by some historians as the founder of the House of Brederode; the territory of Brederode, however, had already been in the possession of his father, who came from the Van Teylingen family, making it possible to consider William to be the first lord of Brederode.

In 1226 Dirk was appointed drost at the court of the count of Holland. He served under Floris IV of Holland and William I of Holland. During the absence of the count, he was the highest official in the county.

Family and children
Dirk married Aleid Averadis van Heusden around 1215; they had at least six children:
William, 2nd lord of Brederode (1226–1285), Dirk's successor
Dirk of Brederode (1228–1279), knighted around 1255
Floris of Brederode (1230 – after 1306), lord of Doortoge
Aleidis of Brederode (1232 – c. 1262)
Catharina of Brederode (born 1234, date of death unknown)
Agnies of Brederode (c. 1245 – c. 1280)

After Dirk's death, his wife Aleid van Heusden married Herbaren II van der Lede

References
 Johannes a Leydis, Opusculum de gestis regalium abbatum monasterii sancti Athalberti ordinis sancti Benedicti in Egmonda (written between 1477 and 1484).
 Willem Procurator, (translated by M. Gumbert-Hepp; J.P. Gumbert (ed.),  Kroniek. Hilversum, Publisher Verloren, 2001
 C. Pijnacker Hordijk in de Werken, Published by the Historisch Genootschap at Utrecht, 3e serie, no 20, Amsterdam 1904
 Nederlandsche Leeuw 1926 kol. 234

1236 deaths
1180s births
Dirk
12th-century people of the Holy Roman Empire
13th-century people of the Holy Roman Empire